The Louis Botha government appointed the members of the government in South Africa led by Prime Minister Louis Botha between 31 May 1910 and 3 September 1919.

The former boer general Louis Botha, Prime Minister of Transvaal was appointed by the British crown to become the first Prime Minister of the Union of South Africa during its formation on 31 May 1910. The very first national general elections were held on 15 September 1910 and ended in the victory of the coalition led by the "Het Volk" party led by Louis Botha (67 seats) against the 37 seats won by the Unionists of Leander Starr Jameson. The remaining 26 seats were won by small parties.

The Botha coalition, made up of Anglo-Afrikaner parties, became the South African Party. In Elections of October 1915, the South African Party won 54 seats against 40 for Unionists 27 seats in the National Party, 4 seats to the Labour Party of South Africa and six seats distributed among small groups.

Cabinet

Sources

Government of South Africa
Executive branch of the government of South Africa
Cabinets of South Africa
1910 establishments in South Africa
1915 disestablishments in South Africa
Cabinets established in 1910
Cabinets disestablished in 1915